James Matthew Morgan (born February 5, 1973) is a Republican member of the Maryland House of Delegates representing District 29A which includes the Northwestern portion of St. Mary's County.

Early life and education
Morgan was born on February 5, 1973, in La Plata, Maryland. He graduated from Maurice J. McDonough High School in nearby Pomfret, Maryland.

In the legislature
Morgan was sworn into the Maryland House of Delegates on January 14, 2015. From 2019 to 2021, he served as the Assistant Minority Leader of the House of Delegates. In 2021, Morgan ran for Minority Leader of the House of Delegates on a ticket with Delegate Mark N. Fisher. The Adams-Morgan ticket was defeated by Jason C. Buckel and Haven Shoemaker by a "more than a 2–1 margin".

Committee assignments
 Member, Health and Government Operations Committee, 2015–present (government operations & long-term care subcommittee, 2015–2017; public health & minority health disparities subcommittee, 2015–2020; government operations & estates & trusts subcommittee, 2017–2019; health occupations & long-term care subcommittee, 2020–present; insurance & pharmaceuticals subcommittee, 2021–present)
 Joint Committee on Federal Relations, 2019–present

Other memberships
 Chair, St. Mary's County House Delegation, 2019–present

Political positions

Elections
In 2015, Morgan joined Neil Parrott in filing a lawsuit challenging the state's congressional districts.

Morgan opposed a 2021 bill that would require elections for county commissioners to only be decided by voters within the districts in which the candidate is running. During debate on the legislation, he introduced an amendment that would impose the same rules on school board districts, which was rejected by a 45–93 vote. The bill later passed the House of Delegates by a vote of 95-39.

Morgan opposed legislation introduced during the 2021 legislative session that would send a mail-in ballot to every registered voter in both the state's primary and general elections.

In April 2021, Morgan proposed an amendment that would make top law enforcement officers in each jurisdiction elected by local members of the public.

Gun control
Following a March 2018 school shooting at Great Mills High School, located within Morgan's district, Morgan responded with pessimism that proposed gun control legislation would be effective in preventing future shootings, saying "I don't know if there is a policy fix." During the 2019 legislative session, Morgan introduced legislation to give local school systems the ability to station police officers at every school within its jurisdiction.

Healthcare
Morgan opposed a 2019 bill to create a Prescription Drug Affordability Board to negotiate the prices of prescription drugs, expressing concern that the board would lead to shortages of life-saving medications.

National politics
Morgan supported Donald Trump in the 2020 presidential election. He criticized Michael Steele's decision to join The Lincoln Project, saying "It definitely conflicts with where the party is as a whole."

Social issues
In March 2018, Morgan opposed legislation that would have renamed the Harry W. Nice Memorial Bridge after senator Thomas M. Middleton.

In April of the same year, Morgan proposed an amendment to expand net neutrality legislation to regulate privacy policies on social media companies; the amendment was rejected over concerns that it did not fit the scope of the bill.

Following the murder of George Floyd on May 25, 2020, Morgan called Floyd's death "tragic" and indefensible" while accusing Democrats of using the incident as an "excuse to drive political narrative" and "dismantle the police departments".

Electoral history

References

Republican Party members of the Maryland House of Delegates
Living people
1973 births
21st-century American politicians